The 2013 Haridwar Municipal Corporation election was a municipal election to the Haridwar Municipal Corporation, which governs Haridwar in Uttarakhand. It took place on 28 April 2013.

Election Schedule

Mayoral election

Position of the house

See also
2013 Uttarakhand local elections
2013 Dehradun Municipal Corporation election

References 

Haridwar
Local elections in Uttarakhand
History of Haridwar
2013 elections in India